Andrew McDermott (1889 – 12 July 1915) was a Scottish professional footballer who played in the Scottish League for Leith Athletic as a goalkeeper.

Personal life 
McDermott worked as a lithographer. After the outbreak of the First World War in August 1914, McDermott enlisted in the Royal Scots. He was serving as an appointed lance corporal when he received facial wounds at Gallipoli on 28 June 1915, from which he died on 12 July 1915. He was commemorated on the Helles Memorial.

References 

Scottish footballers
1915 deaths
British Army personnel of World War I
British military personnel killed in World War I
1889 births
Footballers from Edinburgh
Royal Scots soldiers
Scottish Football League players
Newtongrange Star F.C. players
Leith Athletic F.C. players
Association football goalkeepers
Scottish lithographers
20th-century Scottish male artists